Superbird-2, also identified as Superbird-B after launch if successful, was a geostationary communications satellite designed and manufactured by Ford Aerospace on the SSL 1300 satellite bus. It was originally ordered by Space Communications Corporation (SCC), which later merged into the SKY Perfect JSAT Group. It had a mixed Ku-band, Ka-band and X-band payload and was lost at launch.

It was ordered in 1985 along Superbird-A, Superbird-A1 and Superbird-B1 on the very first order of the SSL 1300 platform. It was to be the second satellite of SCC. It was supposed to be used for video distribution, news gathering, remote publishing and high definition TV service to the main islands of Japan and Okinawa from the 162° East position.

Satellite description 
The spacecraft was the second satellite designed and manufactured by Ford Aerospace on the SSL 1300 satellite bus. It was based on the design of the Intelsat V series and offered a three-axis stabilized platform.

With its solar panels fully extended it spanned . Its power system generated approximately 4 kW of power due to two wings with three solar panels each. It also had dual NiH2 battery to survive the solar eclipses. It was supposed to serve as the main satellite on the 162° East position of the Superbird fleet.

It included enough propellant for orbit circularization and 10 years of operation.

History 
Space Communications Corporation (SCC) was founded in 1985, the same year as the original companies that later formed JSAT. In 1986, SCC ordered four spacecraft from Space Systems/Loral: Superbird-1, Superbird-2, Superbird-A1 and Superbird-B1.

On 22 February 1990, at 23:17:00 UTC, Superbird-2 was launched aboard an Ariane 44L along with BS-2X. At 100 seconds into the flight, the flight failed due to a red handkerchief that blocked a water line in one of the Viking engines of the first stage. Both satellites were lost, and Superbird-B1 was rushed into launch.

References 

Communications satellites in geostationary orbit
Satellites using the SSL 1300 bus
Spacecraft launched in 1989
Communications satellites of Japan
1989 in Japan